Raymond Anthony Townsend (born December 20, 1955) is an American retired professional basketball player. He played three seasons in the National Basketball Association (NBA) with the Golden State Warriors and the Indiana Pacers. Townsend played college basketball with the UCLA Bruins, earning all-conference honors in the Pacific-8 (known later as the Pac-12). He was selected by the Warriors in the first round of the 1978 NBA draft, with the 22nd overall pick, and became the first Filipino-American to play in the NBA. During his playing career, he was listed at 6'3" (1.91 m) tall and 175 lbs. (79 kg). He played at the point guard position.

High school career
Townsend attended Camden High School and Archbishop Mitty High School, in San Jose, California, where he played high school basketball. As a high school senior, he averaged close to 28 points a game for the Camden High Cougars. This was prior to the 3 point shot line being regulated years later. After graduating from high school, he played college basketball at UCLA.

College career
Townsend played college basketball at UCLA, with the UCLA Bruins. He was a member of the 1975 UCLA National Basketball Championship team, which was the 10th and final NCAA championship team of the school's head coach, John Wooden. He earned first-team All-Pac-8 honors as a senior, in 1978.

Professional career
Townsend was selected with the last pick in the first round (22nd overall), of the 1978 NBA draft, by the Golden State Warriors. He was the first Filipino-American to play in the NBA. He concluded his NBA career in 1982, as a member of the Indiana Pacers. He also played in Italy's LBA with Banco Roma, during the 1984–85 season. With Roma, he won the 1984 edition of the FIBA Intercontinental Cup.

Personal life
Townsend was born in San Jose, California. He is half-Filipino through his mother. A 1976 Sports Illustrated issue featured Townsend's father, Ray Sr., in its "Faces in the Crowd" section. He was recognized as "the oldest junior college basketball player in history." At age 39, he was the second man off the bench.

Townsend's brother, Kurtis, is an assistant coach for the Kansas Jayhawks team that won the 2008 and 2022 NCAA Championships. After his basketball playing career, Townsend worked as youth sports development coordinator in San Jose, California.

References

External links

Italian League Profile 

1955 births
Living people
Alberta Dusters players
American expatriate basketball people in Brazil
American expatriate basketball people in Canada
American expatriate basketball people in Italy
American men's basketball players
American sportspeople of Filipino descent
Basketball players from San Jose, California
Clube Atlético Monte Líbano basketball players
Dallas Mavericks expansion draft picks
Esporte Clube Sírio basketball players
Golden State Warriors draft picks
Golden State Warriors players
Indiana Pacers players
Montana Golden Nuggets players
Pallacanestro Virtus Roma players
Point guards
Shooting guards
UCLA Bruins men's basketball players